Tai Kiu Tsuen is a historic walled village in Shap Pat Heung, Yuen Long District, Hong Kong.

Administration
Tai Kiu Tsuen is a recognized village under the New Territories Small House Policy. For electoral purposes, Tai Kiu Tsuen is located in Yuen Long Tung Tau constituency of the Yuen Long District Council. It was formerly represented by Lam Ting-wai, who was elected in the 2019 elections until July 2021.

See also
 Walled villages of Hong Kong
 Yuen Long Kau Hui

References

External links

 Delineation of area of existing village Tai Kiu (Shap Pat Heung) for election of resident representative (2019 to 2022)

Walled villages of Hong Kong
Shap Pat Heung
Villages in Yuen Long District, Hong Kong